22 Cygni is a binary star system in the northern constellation of Cygnus. It is visible to the naked eye as a faint, blue-white hued star with an apparent visual magnitude of 4.95. The annual shift of  yields a distance estimate of around 1,070 light years. It is moving closer to the Earth with a heliocentric radial velocity of −15 km/s.

This is a single-lined spectroscopic binary with an orbital period of 78.2 days and an eccentricity of roughly 0.17. The visible component has a stellar classification of B5 IV that matches a B-type subgiant star. It is 37 million years old with a projected rotational velocity of 30 km/s and has an essentially solar metallicity, within the margin of error. The star has eight times the mass of the Sun and about 5.6 times the Sun's radius. It is radiating 7,305 times the Sun's luminosity from its photosphere at an effective temperature of 15,200 K.

References

B-type subgiants
Cygnus (constellation)
Durchmusterung objects
Cygni, 22
188892
098068
7613
Spectroscopic binaries